Lost Child 312 (German: Suchkind 312) is a 1955 West German drama film directed by Gustav Machatý and starring Inge Egger, Paul Klinger and Heli Finkenzeller. It was shot at the Bendestorf Studios outside Hamburg. The film's sets were designed by the art directors Dieter Bartels and Max Mellin. It was the final film of Czech director Machatý .

Synopsis
In the chaos after the Second World War, millions are missing. Urusla, a German mother seeking her child who she lost while fleeing from the expulsion of Germans, puts in a request. Because her fiancée died fighting on the Eastern Front she remarries again to a doctor. Several years later she sees a picture in a paper she realises it is her own lost daughter. However, her husband, fears that the child's illegitimacy will ruin his job prospects. In addition it turns out that Urusula's fiancée is not dead, but has been held as a Soviet prisoner of war. Troubles over the legal case over the girl are ultimately settled, when he falls in love with the sister of Urusua's husband.

Cast
 Inge Egger as 	Ursula
 Paul Klinger as Dr. Richard Gothe
 Ingrid Simon as 	Suchkind 312', Martina, Ursulas Tochter
 Heli Finkenzeller as 	Jo
 Alexander Kerst as Achim Lenau
 Berta Drews as Frau Brennecke
 Jutta Friedrick as Frau Lohmann
 Stefan Haar as 	Kind
 Karin Hardt as 	Aufseherin im Kinderheim
 Werner Hessenland as 	Herr Lohmann
 Hans Leibelt as 	Rechtsanwalt
 Inge Moldenhauer as Kind
 Renate Schacht as Nina
 Josef Sieber as Herr Brennecke
 Pia von Rüden as Frau Zimmermann

References

Bibliography
 Moeller, Robert G. War Stories: The Search for a Usable Past in the Federal Republic of Germany. University of California Press,  2003.

External links 
 

1955 films
1955 drama films
German drama films
West German films
1950s German-language films
Films directed by Gustav Machatý
1950s German films

de:Suchkind 312 (1955)